
The following are lists of Columbia Pictures films by decade:

Lists
List of Columbia Pictures films (1922–1939)
List of Columbia Pictures films (1940–1949)
List of Columbia Pictures films (1950–1959)
List of Columbia Pictures films (1960–1969)
List of Columbia Pictures films (1970–1979)
List of Columbia Pictures films (1980–1989)
List of Columbia Pictures films (1990–1999)
List of Columbia Pictures films (2000–2009)
List of Columbia Pictures films (2010–2019)
List of Columbia Pictures films (2020–2029)

See also
 
 Columbia Pictures
 List of TriStar Pictures films
 List of Screen Gems films
 Sony Pictures Classics
 :Category:Lists of films by studio

 
Lists of films by studio
American films by studio

Sony Pictures Entertainment Motion Picture Group